Bucchieri is an Italian surname. Notable people with the surname include:

Giovanni Bucchieri, Swedish musician

See also
Bicchieri
Buccheri

Italian-language surnames